Russia has participated in the biennial classical music competition Eurovision Young Musicians 8 times since its debut in 1994. After missing three contests from 2012 to 2016, Russia earned their first win with pianist Ivan Bessonov at the 2018 contest. Prior to that, the country's best result had been four third-place finishes, in 2000, 2004, 2006 and 2010.

Participation overview

See also
Russia in the Eurovision Song Contest
Russia in the Eurovision Dance Contest
Russia in the Junior Eurovision Song Contest

References

External links 
 Eurovision Young Musicians

Countries in the Eurovision Young Musicians